Currimao, officially the Municipality of Currimao, is a 4th class municipality in the province of Ilocos Norte, Philippines. According to the 2020 census, it has a population of 12,215 people.

It is surrounded by Pinili in the south, Batac in the east, South China Sea in the west, and Paoay in the north.

Geography

Barangays

Currimao is politically subdivided into 23 barangays. These barangays are headed by elected officials: Barangay Captain, Barangay Council, whose members are called Barangay Councilors. All are elected every three years.

 Anggapang Norte
 Anggapang Norte
 Anggapang Sur
 Bimmanga
 Cabuusan
 Comcomloong
 Gaang
 Lang-ayan-Baramban
 Lioes
 Maglaoi Centro
 Maglaoi Norte
 Maglaoi Sur
 Paguludan-Salindeg
 Pangil
 Pias Norte
 Pias Sur
 Poblacion I
 Poblacion II
 Salugan
 San Simeon
 Santa Cruz
 Tapao-Tigue
 Torre
 Victoria

Climate

Demographics

Economy

Government
Currimao, belonging to the second congressional district of the province of Ilocos Norte, is governed by a mayor designated as its local chief executive and by a municipal council as its legislative body in accordance with the Local Government Code. The mayor, vice mayor, and the councilors are elected directly by the people through an election which is being held every three years.

Elected officials

References

External links

[ Philippine Standard Geographic Code]
Philippine Census Information
Local Governance Performance Management System

Municipalities of Ilocos Norte